Rodionova is a Slavic female surname that may refer to:

 Alexandra Rodionova (born 1984), Russian luger
 Anastasia Rodionova (born 1982), Russian-Australian tennis player
 Anna Rodionova (born 1996), Russian artistic gymnast
 Arina Rodionova (born 1989), Russian-Australian tennis player, younger sister of Anastasia
 Inga Rodionova (born 1980), pair skater
 Olga Rodionova (born 1975), model, actress and TV presenter
 Tatyana Rodionova (disambiguation) (several people)
 Yuliya Rodionova (born 1990), Olympic freestyle skier from Kazakhstan

See also 
 Rodionov, male counterpart